The Hoare–Laval Pact was an initially secret December 1935 proposal by British Foreign Secretary Samuel Hoare and French Prime Minister Pierre Laval for ending the Second Italo-Ethiopian War. Italy had wanted to seize the independent nation of Abyssinia (Ethiopia) as part of its Italian Empire and also avenge the 1896 Battle of Adwa, a humiliating defeat. The Pact offered to partition Abyssinia and thus partially achieve Italian dictator Benito Mussolini's goal of making the independent nation of Abyssinia into an Italian colony.

The proposal ignited a firestorm of hostile reaction in Britain and France and  never went into effect. Hoare and Laval were both sacked.

Background
In 1935 the Abyssinian Crisis and Second Italo-Ethiopian War began. In the United Kingdom many people and the official opposition supported  League of Nations sanctions against Fascist Italy, as did the Dominions. The government hoped that strong sanctions against Italy might discourage Nazi Germany from similar actions, and won the November general election with a pro-League platform.

On 8 December 1935, British Foreign Secretary Sir Samuel Hoare discussed with his French counterpart Pierre Laval (who was both Prime Minister and Foreign Minister) how to end the war. On 9 December British newspapers revealed leaked details of an agreement by the two men to give much of Ethiopia to Italy to end the war. The British Cabinet had not approved the preliminary plan, but decided to support it to not embarrass Hoare.

Reaction

Britain

The Pact was met with a wave of moral indignation in Britain. On 10 December the Opposition Labour Party claimed if the reports in the press of the contents of the Pact were true,  the government contradicted the pro-League policy on which it had just won the 1935 election.
 
The Conservatives dominated the government and cared little for opinion on the left. They paid attention, however, when attacks came from the right.  In an editorial titled ‘A Corridor for Camels’, The Times on 16 December denounced the Pact and said there never was "the slightest doubt that British public opinion would recommend them for approval by the League as a fair and reasonable basis of negotiations". The Archbishop of Canterbury, Cosmo Lang, condemned the Pact in a letter to The Times, and many other bishops wrote directly to Stanley Baldwin to oppose it.

Duff Cooper, the Secretary of State for War, later wrote:

But before the Duce had time to declare himself there arose a howl of indignation from the people of Great Britain. During my experience of politics I have never witnessed so devastating a wave of public opinion. Even the easy-going constituents of the St. George's division were profoundly moved. The post-bag was full and the letters I received were not written by ignorant or emotional people but by responsible citizens who had given sober thought to the matter.

The Conservative Chief Whip told Baldwin: "Our men won't stand for it". Sir Austen Chamberlain in a speech to the Conservative Foreign Affairs Committee condemned the Pact and said: "Gentlemen do not behave in such a way". Harold Nicolson later wrote that he had had sleepless nights worrying whether he could keep his seat.

France

When the Chamber of Deputies debated the Pact on 27 and 28 December, the Popular Front condemned it, with Léon Blum telling Laval: "You have tried to give and to keep. You wanted to have your cake and eat it. You cancelled your words by your deeds and your deeds by your words. You have debased everything by fixing, intrigue and slickness.... Not sensitive enough to the importance of great moral issues, you have reduced everything to the level of your petty methods".

Yvon Delbos declared: "Your plan is dead and buried. From its failure, which is as total as possible, you could have – but you have not – drawn a personal conclusion. Two lessons emerge. The first is that you were in a dead end because you upset everyone without satisfying Italy. The second is that we must return to the spirit of the Covenant [of the League of Nations] by preserving agreement with the nations gathered at Geneva".

Paul Reynaud attacked the government for aiding Hitler by ruining the Anglo-French alliance. On the motion of censure, the French government had a majority of 296 votes to 276, with 37 Radicals voting for the government.

Outcome
The British government withdrew the plan, and Hoare resigned. In early 1936 Italy began a new, larger advance using poison gas, and entered Addis Ababa on 5 May 1936.

Historiography

A. J. P. Taylor argued that it was the event that "killed the League [of Nations]" and that the pact "was a perfectly sensible plan, in line with the League's previous acts of conciliation from Corfu to Manchuria" which would have "ended the war; satisfied Italy; and left Abyssinia with a more workable, national territory" but that the "common sense of the plan was, in the circumstances of the time, its vital defect".

The military historian Correlli Barnett has argued that if Britain alienated Italy, Italy "would be a potential enemy astride England's main line of imperial communication at a time when she was already under threat from two existing potential enemies at opposite ends of the line [Germany and Japan]. If – worse – Italy were to fight in a future war as an ally of Germany or Japan, or both, the British would be forced to abandon the Mediterranean for the first time since 1798". Therefore, in Barnett's view, it was "highly dangerous nonsense to provoke Italy" due to Britain's military and naval weakness and that therefore the pact was a sensible option.

See also
 Italo–Ethiopian Treaty of 1928

Notes

Further reading 
 Callahan, Mihael D. The League of Nations, International Terrorism, and British Foreign Policy, 1934-1938 (Springer, 2018).
 Davis, Richard. Anglo-French relations before the Second World War: appeasement and crisis (Springer, 2001).
 Henderson, B. Braddick, "The Hoare-Laval Plan: A Study in International Politics," Review of Politics (1962) 24#3 pp. 342–364 in JSTOR
 Holt, Andrew. "'No more Hoares to Paris’: British foreign policymaking and the Abyssinian Crisis, 1935," Review of International Studies (2011) 37#3 pp. 1383–1401. online
 McKercher, Brian JC. "National security and imperial defence: British grand strategy and appeasement, 1930–1939." Diplomacy and Statecraft 19.3 (2008): 391-442. online

 Robertson James C. "The Hoare-Laval Plan," Journal of Contemporary History (1975) 10#3 pp. 433–464 in JSTOR
 Schuman, Frederick L. Europe On The Eve 1933-1939 (1939)  pp 128–152.online
 Strang, G. Bruce. "“The Worst of all Worlds:” Oil Sanctions and Italy's Invasion of Abyssinia, 1935–1936." Diplomacy and Statecraft 19.2 (2008): 210-235.
 Strang, G. Bruce, ed. Collision of Empires: Italy's Invasion of Ethiopia and its International Impact (2013)' 13 essays by scholars. contents

Treaties concluded in 1935
1935 in the United Kingdom
1935 in Ethiopia
1935 in France
1935 in Italy
Politics of France
1935 in international relations
France–United Kingdom relations
France–Italy relations
Italy–United Kingdom relations
1935 in British politics
Pierre Laval